Erik Gunnar "Epa" Johansson (29 September 1927 – 16 December 1992) was a Swedish ice hockey player. Between 1947 and 1959 he played 142 international matches and scored 73 goals. He won an Olympic bronze in 1952 and the world title in 1953, finishing second in 1947 and 1951 and third in 1954. He was also a Swedish champion with Södertälje SK in 1953 and 1956. After retiring from competitions he worked as an ice hockey coach with BK Remo.

References

1927 births
1992 deaths
Ice hockey players at the 1952 Winter Olympics
Olympic bronze medalists for Sweden
Olympic ice hockey players of Sweden
Olympic medalists in ice hockey
People from Södertälje
Södertälje SK players
Medalists at the 1952 Winter Olympics
Sportspeople from Stockholm County